R404 road  may refer to:
 R404 road (Ireland)
 R404 road (South Africa)